Yisroel Hopstein (1737–1814), also known as the Maggid of Kozhnitz, was the founder of Kozhnitz Hasidism, and a noted hasidic leader in Poland during the late 18th and early 19th century. He was a student of both the Magid/Dov Ber of Mezeritch and Elimelech of Lizhensk, and wrote many books on Chassidus and Kabbalah.
He is sometimes referred to as "the Avodat Yisrael" for his works.

Biography
Hopstein was born in Opatów, to his father, Shabbetai, who was at an advanced age, after having received a blessing from the Baal Shem Tov. The father was a bookbinder; his mother's name was Perl.

As a young child he was recognized as an illui (prodigy). He studied under the tutelage of Rabbi Shmelke of Nikolsburg, who eventually convinced Hopstein to learn with Dov Ber, the Maggid of Mezritch. After the passing of Dov Ber, he went to learn with Elimelech of Lizhensk.

Hopstein lived for years in Kozhnitz (Kozienice), was founder of the Kozhnitz Hasidic dynasty, and died the 14th of Tishrei (September 28, 1814).

Family
Hopstein was married to Royze. They had 3 children, (two sons and one daughter): 
 Rabbi Moshe Elyakim who eventually replaced his father as Rebbe after Hopstein's death,
 Leah Perl (who married Avi Ezra Zelig Shapira, Rabbi of Grenitz), and, 
 Mottel, who died in his youth.
 His great-grandson was Rabbi Kalonymus Kalman Shapira of Piaseczna.

Works
Hopstein authored many works, including:
Avodat Yisrael, a commentary on the Torah and Pirkei Avot
 Beit Yisrael on Talmud
 Chidushei Maggid Mishna on Mishnayot
 Geulat Yisrael on Maharal's works
Gevurat Yisrael, a commentary on the Haggadah of Pesach
Nezer Yisrael, a commentary on the Zohar
 She'erit Yisrael on Midrash, 
Ta'amei Mitzvot, a commentary on the 613 Mitzvot
 Yakar MiPaz on Torah
Or Yisrael, a commentary on the Tikunei HaZohar

References

 

1737 births
1814 deaths
People from Opatów
Hasidic rebbes
Polish Hasidic rabbis
Hasidic rabbis in Europe
Maggidim
Kozhnitz (Hasidic dynasty)
Students of Dov Ber of Mezeritch